Severina Vučković (born 21 April 1972), better known mononymously as Severina, is a Croatian singer-songwriter and actress. In 2006, the Croatian weekly Nacional listed her among the 100 most influential Croats, calling her "the only bona fide Croatian celebrity".

She represented Croatia at the Eurovision Song Contest 2006, held in Athens, Greece, with the song "Moja štikla", finishing 12th.

She won the award "Zlatna ptica" for the best selling artist of the decade in Croatia. In 2015, she was the most searched person on Google in Croatia and Slovenia.

Career

Music
Severina's career was launched in the late 1980s when she began performing in local festivals and competitions. One of her first major performances came in 1989 in her native  Split. In 1990, she moved to Zagreb where she won a radio competition that landed her an album.

That same year she won the first prize at the Zagreb Festival with the song "klopi oči muzika dok svira". She soon became the host of the show Top Cup on Croatian Radio Television (HRT), which she hosted for a year, and at the end of the year she went on her first tour in Australia.

Severina (1990-1992)

In 1990, she released her first studio album titled Severina. The album served as her breakthrough to the national platform, with the hit single "Vodi me na ples".

The songs "Tvoja prva đevja" and "Kad si sam" from her next eponymous record (released in 1992) with composer Zrinko Tutić, became a huge hit among younger fans.

Dalmatinka (1993)

The leading song from her third studio album, Dalmatinka, became a sensation and captured the emotions of many at the time of release. In the song, Severina sang about her love for the native Dalmatia, white color and the Virgin Mary ("First to me is Mary, second to me is white color, and third is your love"). The album had total of 10 songs among which were: "Ne bi ti oprostila", "Ne spavaj mala moja" (cover), "Paloma Nera" and others. Both "Paloma Nera" and "Dalmatinka" became number one on national top list.

Trava zelena (1995)

Her fourth album, Trava zelena, achieved major success. The title song, "Trava zelena", was the most popular song of the year and Severina's primacy on the Croatian media platform rose as a result. It was another collaboration with Tutić.

Moja stvar (1996)

Moja stvar was her fifth studio album. The album was inspired by rock sounds. The song "Moja stvar" was written and composed by Severina herself.

Djevojka sa sela (1998)

The album Djevojka sa sela was composed and written partly by Tutić and partly by Severina. The title song "Djevojka sa sela" is one of her biggest hits. It was used by the Croatian National Football Team as its unofficial anthem during their involvement in the European Football Championship.

Djevojka sa sela was her last album composed by Tutic and his production company Tutico. They parted ways following its release due to a contract dispute.

Ja samo pjevam (1999)

Severina's seventh studio album, Ja sam pjevam, was a continuation of the pop sounds heard on her previous albums. It had total of 10 songs. The composer of this album was Đorđe Novković with whom Severina started working on her next album.

Pogled ispod obrva (2001)

Following the success of her 2001 album Pogled ispod obrva, Severina's 2002 concert tour and live album Virujen u te won her an award for best selling live album along with a nomination for hit song of the year. Virujen u te was her first major tour in which she performed in most of the big cities on the Balkans including Sarajevo, Bosnia and Ljubljana, Slovenia and confirmed her status of one of the most popular Croatian music artists.

Severgeeen (2004)

After a two-year break, she released her 9th studio album Severgreen in 2004. This was her first major project and public appearance after the sex-tape scandal which occurred in 2003. The album was influenced by jazz music. In 2006, she won the Dora festival with the song "Moja štikla" and represented Croatia at the 2006 Eurovision Song Contest in Athens, Greece, finishing in 13th place.

The song caused some controversy in Croatia when a few journalists and musicologists claimed the song resembled the music of Serbia. However, prominent Croatian ethno-musicians such as Dunja Knebl and Lidija Bajuk disagreed, and both the song's composer Boris Novković and Severina herself have claimed that the song includes Croatian folk music influences from the Dalmatian Zagora (Inner Dalmatia) such as ganga and rere singing and lijerica instrumentation. 

After the contest, she started working on her 10th studio album together with Goran Bregović, one of the most successful music composers in the Balkans.

Zdravo Marijo (2008)

Severina's long-anticipated 10th studio album Zdravo Marijo (Hail Mary), mostly composed by Goran Bregović, was released in May 2008. Ater having made several public appearances wearing clothes depicting religious imagery (most notably a tight shirt with an image of the Virgin Mary with Severina showing ample cleavage), some protested the abuse of religious elements, calling them offensive. However, the album has been popular and Severina released four more official music videos for the singles "Tridesete" composed by Sezen Aksu, "Gade", "Haljinica Boje Lila" and "Zdravo, Marijo" (title track) composed by Bregović. Following the release of the album, Severina went on to her second big regional tour. On 15 December 2009, Severina released her next single called "Lola", which is the part of the Miligram compilation.

Dobrodošao u klub (2012)

Her album and tour Dobrodošao u klub (Welcome to the club or DUK') held her at the top of Croatian pop music for all of 2012 and 2013, and established her position as the most popular pop singer in Ex-Yu countries. The album had total of 12 songs, 7 of them singles. The first two songs that were released were "Brad Pitt" and "Grad bez ljudi". "Brad Pitt" became one of the biggest hits of 2011. "Italiana", released in the summer of 2012, was viewed more than half a million times in the first 24 hours and has around 60 million views to this day. Later on, she released "Uzbuna", "Dobrodošao u klub" and "Tarapana". In support of the album she embreak on her second headlining Dobrodošao u Klub Tour. She performed, yet again, in every large city in the region. The tour started in Rijeka in March 2013 and continued in Belgrade (in front of 20,000 people), Zagreb (in front of 19,000 people), Sarajevo (in front of 15,000 people), Ljubljana (in front of 11,000 people) and her native Split (in front of 12,000 people). The whole tour sold more than 250,000 tickets.

2013-2014

In 2013, Severina released the song "Hurem", named after Hurrem Sultan. It was composer and written by Andrej Babić, and the arrangers were Ivan Popeskić and Branko Berković. In March 2014, she released the song "Alcatraz", named after the prison of the same name. Soon after, she released the song "Brazil" to support the national football team of Croatia during the World Cup 2014 in Brazil. 

In July 2014, she released "Uno momento" (One moment), a duet with Serbian band Ministarke. The song was noted for its provocative video clip. It turned out to be highly popular across the Balkans, becoming a summer hit in Croatia, Serbia, Slovenia and Bosnia and Herzegovina. 

In October 2014, she released a song with Serbian singer Saša Matić called "More tuge" ("Sea of Sorrow"). At the end of 2014 she released the song "Generale" with the Croatian band Uciteljice.

Halo (2019)

At the beginning of 2017 she released the song named "Kao". On 27 March she released the second official video from the upcoming album, Otrove featuring Bosnian rapper and producer Jala Brat. The song raised around 15 million views in less than a month, and 29 million views after two months. The third song with its video, Mrtav bez mene, was released on 5 June. In June 2018 she released a music videos for collaborations with Croatian singer Petar Grašo named "Unaprijed Gotovo" ("Already Done") and with Serbian singer Ljuba Stanković named "Tutorial". In July 2018 she released a music video for a song named "M.A.G.I.J.A." ("M.A.G.I.C.") featuring Jala Brat.

Theatre and film 
In 2003 Severina landed her first theatre role at the Croatian National Theatre in Rijeka (HNK Rijeka) and played the title role in the rock opera Karolina Riječka (English: Caroline of Rijeka). Two years later she produced and acted in the monodrama Čekajući svog čovika (Waiting for my Man) at the Kerempuh theatre in Zagreb. In 2007 she was cast for one of the main roles in HNK Rijeka's musical Gospoda Glembajevi (The Glembays; based upon Miroslav Krleža's 1929 play). Although the decision to cast Severina was met with criticism by some commentators who questioned her acting credentials, the musical premiered in March 2007 with considerable success. Severina also starred in a 2006 Bosnian film Duhovi Sarajeva set in Sarajevo. In 2007 she made a 5-minute cameo appearance playing herself in the Slovenian film Petelinji zajtrk (Rooster's Breakfast).

Personal life

Sex tape scandal
In 2004, Vučković was involved in an internationally reported sex scandal after a sex tape featuring her and Bosnian Croat businessman Milan Lučić leaked onto the Internet, which was reported by the Croatian online tabloid Index.hr. The graphic nature of the video and the fact that Lučić was married when the tape was filmed shocked the public. Vučković sued the website that released the tape for damages, claiming that the video was stolen from her and that it was her intellectual property. In 2004 part of the lawsuit about intellectual property was dismissed by the court, but violation of privacy was approved with a compensation of 100,000 kuna.

Relationships
At the beginning of her career, Severina was reported to have been in a relationship with the singer Zrinko Tutić, who was married at the time. Afterwards, she entered into a relationship with singer Alen Marin of the band Kojoti. She later entered into a relationship with music producer Ante Pecotić. In 1999, Severina entered into a brief relationship with the Bosnian model Adnan Taletović, whom she met while filming a music video. In 2000, while still in a relationship with Bosnian Croat general Stanko Sopta, she began an affair with Milan Lučić, a married businessman with whom she recorded a sex tape, which was leaked to the public in 2004. At the time of the tape's release, Severina was reported to be in a relationship with Srećko Vargek, but the two soon broke up. Severina soon entered into a relationship with the economist Mate Čuljak. The relationship lasted a year and a half, but the couple broke up one week before Severina's 35th birthday. Severina soon began dating sports entrepreneur Slavko Šainović. After two and a half years of dating, the couple broke up.

In December 2010, Severina met wealthy Serbian businessman Milan Popović at his birthday celebration, where she was hired to perform. They soon began dating, and in August 2011 she announced that she was pregnant with her first child. On 21 February 2012, she gave birth to a boy named Aleksandar in Split. During the period she lived between Belgrade, Vršac and Zagreb. In October 2012, Severina announced that she and Popović have separated and that she has moved back to Zagreb. At the same time it was announced she had her son baptized in a Catholic church in Rijeka. Several months later the couple reunited until separating for good in August 2013. Since then the couple have been embroiled in custody disputes, with Popović claiming he was not allowed access to see their son, a claim Severina denied.

On 22 October 2015, Severina married Serbian footballer Igor Kojić in Bale, Istria. The couple formally divorced in Zagreb on 19 August 2021.

In 2013 she publicly supported the LGBT community in Croatia.

Discography

Studio albums
 Severina (1990)
 Severina (1992)
 Dalmatinka (1993)
 Trava zelena (1995)
 Moja stvar (1996)
 Djevojka sa sela (1998)
 Ja samo pjevam (1999)
 Pogled ispod obrva (2001)
 Severgreen (2004)
 Zdravo Marijo (2008)
 Dobrodošao u klub (2012)
 Halo (2019)
 Sorry (2023)

EPs
 Bojate Bane Buski (2004)
 Moja štikla (2006)
 Moja štikla / Moj sokole (2006)

Live albums
 Paloma nera – uživo (1993)
 Virujen u te (najbolje uživo!) (2002)
 Tridesete – uživo (2010)
 Dobrodošao u klub live (2014)

Singles

Tours 
Zdravo Marijo Tour (2008–12)
Dobrodošao u Klub Tour (2013)
Magic Tour (2019)

See also 
Lounge music

References

External links 

1972 births
Living people
Musicians from Split, Croatia
Croatian pop singers
Croatian folk-pop singers
21st-century Croatian women singers
Eurovision Song Contest entrants for Croatia
Eurovision Song Contest entrants of 2006
Hayat Production artists
Croatian expatriates in Serbia
Croatian LGBT rights activists
Controversies in Croatia
Sex scandals